Chad Steelberg is an American serial entrepreneur who co-founded AdForce (IPO), 2CAN Media (Sold to CMGi), and dMarc Broadcasting (Sold to Google).  Most recently, Chad Steelberg co-founded Veritone. along with his brother, Ryan Steelberg, and serves as its CEO.

Biography
Chad Edward Steelberg was born in Northridge, California. Chad attended Corona del Mar High School in Newport Beach, CA and after graduation, he went to the University of Southern California.

Chad has co-founded several successful Internet software companies. Chad is the founder of the Veritone Institute for Artificial Intelligence.

In 1995, Chad and his brother Ryan founded AdForce, which was later acquired by CMGI after an IPO worth over $500M. AdForce won the Smithsonian Award for the Best Technology in IT for the year 2000. The Steelbergs founded 2CAN Media and built it into the 3rd largest Internet advertising sales organization, which was also later sold to CMGI for over $50 million in a merger with Adsmart/Engage Media.

Founding dMarc Broadcasting in 2002, Chad and his brother Ryan developed the largest centralized radio advertising network and digital automation company servicing more than 4,600 radio broadcasters. dMarc was sold to Google in 2006 for $102 million.

Chad is the winner of several awards, and is a 2009 recipient of the OC Metro's 40 Under 40 Award given to the most successful young businesspeople in Orange County, CA. 

Chad and Ryan Steelberg were also named by the Orange County Business Journal as one of the county's 50 Most Influential Businesspeople. Additionally, the Steelbergs were finalists for Ernst & Young's ‘Entrepreneur of the Year’ in 2000, followed by Radio Ink Magazine's award for one of the ’50 Most Powerful People in Radio’ in 2006. With his brother, Ryan Steelberg, he is the inventor of 51 issued patents.

Veritone, Inc.
In 2014, Chad and Ryan Steelberg founded Veritone, a cloud-based technology company.

dMarc Broadcasting (Google)
dMarc Broadcasting, founded by the Steelbergs in 2002, is the largest centralized radio advertising network and digital automation company servicing more than 4,600 Radio Broadcasters.  dMarc was sold to Google in 2006 for $102 million in cash, with revenue targets that could push the deal upwards of $1.2B. Total payouts, as of January, 2009 have exceeded $400 million in cash.

AdForce (CMGi)
AdForce (formerly ADFC on NASDAQ), founded by the Steelbergs in 1995 and grown into the world's largest centralized independent ad serving and management solution, was acquired by CMGI after going public for more than $500 million in 1999. AdForce won the Smithsonian Award for the Best Technology in IT, for the year 2000.

2CAN Media (CMGi)
2CAN Media, founded by the Steelbergs in 1998 and built into the 3rd largest Internet advertising sales organization under the Steelbergs, was also later sold to CMGI for over $50 million in a merger with Adsmart/Engage Media.

Awards
In 2009, the SportsBusiness Journal announced their annual "Forty Under 40" list of the best and brightest young executives in sports business. The publication recognized Ryan Steelberg — a relative newcomer to the sports business world — as an innovator in the field of endorsements.  Others named to the 2009 list include David Berson, executive vice president of program planning and strategy for ESPN; Sarah Robb O'Hagan, chief marketing officer for Gatorade; and Peter Farnsworth, senior vice president of business development for the NBA.

A 2009 recipient of the OC Metro's 40 Under 40 Award given to the most successful young businesspeople in Orange County, CA.  The Steelbergs were also named by the Orange County Business Journal as one of the county's “50 Most Influential Businesspeople,” Ryan and Chad were also finalists for Ernst & Young’s “Entrepreneur of the Year” in 2000. Most recently, in 2006, Chad and Ryan Steelberg were named one of the “50 Most Powerful People in Radio,“ by Radio Ink Magazine.

References

Peter Bernstein, "Veritone Launches Cloud-Based Cognitive Media Platform". TMCnet - Cloud Computing, August 25, 2015.

Kafka, Peter, "A New Scheme to Get Web Surfers to Stay Put: Photos", All Things Digital, Wall Street Journal, August 3, 2010.

Ives, Nat, "Making News Sites Stickier With Apps that Summon the Web", Advertising Age, August 3, 2010.

Keegan, Paul, "The Future Is Now", Fortune Magazine, August 2, 2010.

Olson, Mike. "Player's Choice", Wired Magazine, June 1, 2010.

Elliot, Stuart, "A Place Where Sponsors Sign Athletes", New York Times, October 18, 2009.

Helft, Miguel. "Google Encounters Hurdles in Selling Radio Advertising", New York Times, February 10, 2007.

"What the Google/dMarc "Marriage" Means for Radio", Radio Ink Magazine, February 27, 2006.

Chuang, T. "O.C. venture gets Googled", Orange County Business Journal, June 17, 2002.

http://www.clickz.com/clickz/news/2028864/kardashian-sisters-tweet-gilt-groupe-oscars

http://www.fortune.com/BAT

http://mediamemo.allthingsd.com/20100803/a-new-scheme-to-get-web-surfers-to-stay-put-photos/

https://www.nytimes.com/2009/10/19/business/media/19adcol.html?_r=2&ref=business

http://adage.com/mediaworks/article?article_id=145222

https://web.archive.org/web/20080408164316/http://www.rwonline.com/reference-room/special-report/2006.02.15-03_rw_google_2.shtml

http://www.ocmetro.com/archives/ocmetro_2006/metro042706/cover042706.html

http://www.ocmetro.com/t-CoverStory_40Under40_19_Ryan_Steelberg0509.aspx

http://www.sportsbusinessjournal.com

1971 births
Living people